Chepillo is a corregimiento in Chepo District, Panamá Province, Panama with a population of 255 as of 2010. Its population as of 1990 was 254; its population as of 2000 was 237.

References

Corregimientos of Panamá Province